Tropopterus is a genus of beetles in the family Carabidae, containing the following species:

 Tropopterus duponcheli Solier, 1849
 Tropopterus giraudyi Solier, 1849
 Tropopterus mintagnei Solier, 1849
 Tropopterus peruvianus Straneo, 1954

References

Psydrinae